The People of Forever Are Not Afraid is a novel by the Israeli writer Shani Boianjiu, published in 2012.

Plot
The People of Forever Are Not Afraid tells the story of three young Israeli women - Lea, Avishag and Yael - following them from their high school years in a small northern village, through their enlistment in the Israeli Defence Force where they train marksmen, guard a border and man a checkpoint, and on to their twenties. The book describes the progress of the three women in a series of vignettes.

Reviews
In the United States, the Wall Street Journal said the book is “a dark, riveting window into the mind-state of Israel's younger generation…[and] …marks the arrival of a brilliant writer,” and cited the “candid, convincing psychological profiles of the three heroines.” LA Review of Books called it a “beautifully rendered account of the absurdities and pathos inherent to everyday life in Israel.” The Washington Post said the prose “has a flat, harsh glare that can seem benumbing at first but evokes the deadening that comes of constant war.” NPR said the novel has “appealing main characters” and “refreshing frankness” but that there is “not much war” in the book, “just small doses of bad behavior on both sides of the line, and nearly 350 pages of frank and episodic scenes about female life in the IDF, which by midway through the book begin to lose their charm.” The Washington Independent Review of Books said the book is “engaging and revealing … a fascinating look at Israeli army life” but that its “awkward structure” and first-person voices made it “hard to follow the chain of events,” so “the stories and anecdotes never quite come together in a unified whole.” The Examiner found Boianjiu's “flat” characters to be authentic and said the author forced the critic "to breathe, think, and feel the pain of her characters and her enemies,” and that the book “was validly realistic. The style suited the age of the characters and their situation.” Jewish Ideas Daily said the author's unique use of the English language, “put her solidly within the modern Jewish tradition of transnational and multilingual literature." The New York Times said that "though it’s called a novel, it’s really a bracing collection of linked stories," and that the author's “voice is distinct. It’s confident, raw, amusing — a lot like her women." The New Republic said the novel is "carefully wrought, consciously structured [and] creatively imagined."

In the United Kingdom, The Daily Telegraph said the book was “a memorably bold novel… Boianjiu has created a brave, beautiful political literature that is entirely her own.” The Sunday Times said the book was an “impressive first novel... In a humorous, restrained and beguiling deadpan,” the book delivers “a rare insight into the boredom, fear and thrills of young Israelis being minced through military service.” The Observer said that “the author successfully finds a voice to express the dehumanising horror of warfare in this fragmented plot held together with a passionate, poetic eloquence.” The Guardian said the novel's prose, initially “seems charmingly stilted, but soon … starts to grate like a bad translation,” and that it “captures well the dissonance of a transition into womanhood that must take place within the fear-soaked tedium of compulsory military service…but …the narrative feels more like a succession of vignettes.”  The Economist described the novel as a “Bildungsroman” and said that in it “life in the army initiates a metamorphosis from girl to woman…Boianjiu’s depiction of…the psyches of these young women is fascinating… The prose [reads] alternately like a nightmare and a dream, but this feverish indecision is what gives it its power.” The Financial Times said “The corrosive effects of existing on [the] continual knife-edge of boredom and horror are charted in a prose style that is, by turns, sharply comic, lyrically beautiful and chillingly flat … The People of Forever is a modern anthem for doomed youth, a brilliant anatomisation of the yearning for normality in a situation that renders it impossible ... If you still need convincing, read this book.”

In Canada, the Winnipeg Free Press said the novel "is intelligent, disconcerting and powerful... Boianjiu tells it like it is, and in the telling conveys the emotional toll taken on young lives when they are raised in a nascent country where politics, cultures, faiths and histories clash, and borders are always just a stone's throw away.” The Calgary Herald wrote “the book is a remarkably frank, funny, cynical and ultimately sad portrayal of young Israelis, both in and out of military service.” The Canadian Jewish News said, “Powerful, touching stuff… Boianjiu is an exciting, youthful writer, not afraid to take on heavy themes.” Chatelaine said that “Boianjiu’s voice is light, believable and addictive, perfectly contrasting her bubbly teenage characters against the dark moments they go through... This novel is like taking a roller-coaster ride.”

In Germany, the prominent feminist Alice Schwarzer wrote in Emma, “the tone is rough, cool, funny and heartbreaking, despite or because of the unending tragedy … The book is a harrowing voice against the war." Süddeutsche Zeitung called it “a very good book … gripping, cocky and authentic”. Badische Zeitung said the book “is a strong anti-war novel, and can be compared with large genre classics such as Joseph Heller's Catch-22.”

In the Netherlands, VPRO Magazine said it was “a remarkable debut. Boianjiu conjures a harrowing image of the army – an inert and brooding image: the heat, the boredom, the humiliations, the loneliness and the fear. But at the same time the tone of voice is breezy and darkly humorous.” Boek Magazine said “Shani Boianjiu is a more than welcome, necessary new voice in literature who, with her first novel, delivered a fine, bold, painful and moving book. Remember her name.”

In Belgium Knack Focus called it “a brilliant novel in which despair, irony and sexuality power a new generation of women.”

In Hungary, Gittegylet said about the author: “A young and extremely talented first-time author holds a mirror up to the reader, and cheekily asks the question: What is good? What is wrong? Who is right? Who is wrong? …Boianjiu’s novel is both overwhelming and fun. Life in it is not a joke, not for kids, but sometimes it's hilarious, yet at the same time there is always a kid who is dying, and the weird thing is, the kid is someone you could have been. I do not like it that this is so, but so it goes…An excellent novel by a great writer.” Holdkatlan said that “Boianjiu’s very lyrical text is out of control, and the reader can almost wander through the captivating prose’s emotions as if they were music, or popular videos…The polyphonic narrative, beautifully dispatched by the different points of view at different years in the army, and even the language enable you to trace the development of the personality of the girls, their thought, and their physical process of growing up.”

In Sweden, GP said the book was “an exhausting but also very touching and informative read, not least for the language's sake. Boianjiu knows how to use it to portray both darkness and light.” Corren said “this is an important book for those who want to familiarize themselves with how it is to live, especially as a young woman in today's Israel. Teenage boredom, trials, lack of confidence, are portrayed with a strong, intense language and a voice like no other. However, the book as a novel, is not particularly coherent. Time, space and perspective shift a bit too often, and the text becomes feverish - and just as in a fever dream, it becomes difficult to know what really happens in real life.” Sveriges Radio said “even though a soldier’s life is monotonous and boredom takes up a good part of the text, it is often a fun book. Boianjiu portrays zealous army regulations in a way that is reminiscent of Joseph Heller's Catch 22."

In Portugal, Diário Digital called Boianjiu a “small genius … an inexhaustible source of energy.” Time Out Lisbon said she was an “Israeli hurricane”, and that the book's stories were “all united by … urgency, a pace that takes the reader from start to finish.” RUADEBAIXO said that "we may feel close to the protagonists, but we will never be able to understand the feelings of those girls. This story, as much or more than it is the story of young women who have been put to the test by imminent war and a world dominated by men, is also a story about time. How time heals and changes ... So much and so little changes in two years. It all depends on how we choose to spend them."

In Spain, El Imparcial said the book was "a brave, fierce and politically incorrect testimony of Israeli youth ... fictional or real stories of the past … give the book a very light and pleasant pace, with many jumps in time and space ... told with genuine suspense and almost like a movie. The author reveals an amazing ability to get into the atrocities of the war with extreme harshness ... promising writer who undoubtedly awaits many years of career ahead.” En Femenino, which picked the book as one of its ten not-be-missed books of fall 2013, said it is “a provocative story about girl soldiers of Israel … Ultimately, this is an intelligent story that shows the unknown reality of some women who are forced to choose a destiny.” Revista Kritica called the book “a novel in which there is no unnecessary idealism, glory or heroism. Boianjiu presents the situation in her country and the army in total rawness, without masking the reality and beauty. A very faithful portrait.”

In Brazil, Revista Brasileiros said "between the lines, Shani draws up a treaty of a whole generation’s aspirations and the troubled, unpromising future that lies ahead. Her girls figure out that to get out alive they must mature, and fast. When they see each other, they talk about their crushes, make fun of the rules, and try to escape from the boring routine, always under the pressure of their superiors. And just like that, a dark world, little by little, closes in on them ... It’s an impressive story, showing the damages caused by war without resorting to ideological arguments or demonizing the enemy." Correio Braziliense said "with a bittersweet tone … [it is] a narrative stitched with wit and humor." Brazilian Rolling Stone said "the story ... is told so bravely and with such talent by the author - that it reveals the characters, who sound like typical teenagers full of regrets, to be true heroes of an epic journey."

In the Czech Republic, iFORUM said it was "an intimate, must-read account of women in the army; a matrix of conflict, danger, hierarchy, politics, sexism and unapologetic reality, dramatically contrasted with relatable, approachable themes of womanhood. Illuminated with the cutting, witty personality and deeply personal experiences of Boianjiu." IHNED said that "at nearly three hundred and fifty pages of prose scrambles war drama with a girl novel ... It has a sharp style, a surprising distinctive view of the situation, which is usually difficult or even tragic."  Literarni Koutek said that "although the book deals with the serious issue of war and death in the army ... it is not a depressing, but a very interesting reading ... a breathtaking novel that becomes great.”

In Italy, Lundici said it was "an unusual book, a valuable testimony... The language is simple, fresh and dismissive of young people, often paradoxical and streaked with nonsense, in which the narrative voices alternate, today and yesterday take turns ... Sometimes [the girls] are afraid, but at the same time, they are courageous in facing the dangers and know how to laugh at their own weaknesses." TGCOM said, "forget Amos Oz, Grossman and Yehoshua. Shani Boianjiu remembers more than Yizhar, the writer who 60 years ago described the ethnic cleansing of the Palestinian villages of the soldiers of Israel. Boianjiu give voice to girls scared and arrogant ... able to surprise you with moments of their delusions and paranoia, and also with moments of their independence." SoloLibri said the book was "a repeated punch in the stomach...There is no lack of irony in the novel's moments. Joy and love always remain in the mouth, but so does the bitterness of knowing that the meeting with those teenagers was not just a feeling but the truth.”

In Serbia, Domino said it was an "exquisite and moving drama about the life of women in Israel ... Although the novel's subject matter is serious and difficult, it was written with a lot of irony and humor."

In Poland, Uwazam Rze wrote that the book has "moving themes of friendship, sex, violence, family, nationalism, war and trauma. Boianjiu has a unique voice ... For the Polish reader there may be a lesson: let us rejoice that we live in a country without compulsory military service. And let us be grateful to those who serve voluntarily."

In Iceland, Spássían wrote that the book is “a collection of events, a holistic, flowing narrative. The story has a beginning and an end, and the narrative seems to be more or less in chronological order. Shani, however, chooses rather to focus on individual events and describe them in great detail, rather than trying to describe life in the military in general terms … focusing on the human side of the conflict by allowing us to get to know the characters on both sides of the line ... but in the end, the reader is left with a bad taste in the mouth about the reality of young people living in the area.”

In France, Elle wrote that "Shani Boianjiu delivers a remarkable novel... Delirious dreamlike delusions, little tricks between colonies, kibbutz and check-point, broken friends, remorse, excesses, exactions, hobbies under the watchtowers and full of sand, there is all this in this generational and desperate, spasmodic and tragic novel"

In Israel, Haaretz wrote that the book "may be dark and grim, but does not in any way lack humor. Shani Boianjiu is a very funny writer, and she places her characters in some drolly amusing situations ... What gives Boianjiu’s work an extra jolt is that every so often, without warning, she crosses the line delimiting reality to present a surreal, often grotesque vision. We know that it can’t be real, but we aren’t sure just when the line was crossed. Suddenly, though, there’s a feeling of the oxygen having been sucked from the room." Ynet said that "[Boianjiu] wrote a moving novel, in English, for Americans who don't know the details and horrors of the reality of life here, and she did that with a clear and uncompromising voice that forces the Israeli reader to look at that reality, that oftentimes he might want to deny and repress, at least through a literary work. There's nowhere to escape to in this book, because the comic moments get broken to pieces and collected back together by the hand of an artist. One can only be saddened by the content, admire the achievement and enjoy the realistic-absurdity of it."

Awards and recognition
Boianjiu was the first Israeli author to be longlisted for the UK's Women's Prize for Fiction, and the youngest nominee that year (2013). Her debut novel was selected as one of the ten best fiction titles of 2012 by The Wall Street Journal,  as one of the Pakistani Herald's best books of 2012, and as one of the Swedish Sydsvenskan's best books of 2013.

Boianjiu is the youngest recipient ever of the National Book Foundation's 5 Under 35 award, based on a recommendation from the writer Nicole Krauss. She was a semi-finalist for the VCU Cabell First Novelist Award, and selected as one of The Algemeiner's Jewish 100.
The book was shortlisted for the Sami Rohr Prize for Jewish Literature in 2013. She is currently shortlisted for the 2014 Jewish Quarterly Wingate Prize.

Editions
 American (hardcover): The People of Forever Are Not Afraid. Hogarth. September 11, 2012. .
 American (paperback): 
 Brazilian: O Povo Eterno não tem Medo. Alfaguara. 2013. . Translated by Débora Landsberg.
 Canadian: The People of Forever Are Not Afraid. Anchor. .
 Croatian: Vječne ratnice. Znanje. December 3, 2012. . Translated by Marta Klepo.
 Czech:  Translated by Tomáš Suchomel.
 Danish: Det evige folk har ingen frygt. Gyldenal. September 2013. .
 Dutch:  Translated by Auke Leistra.
 French:  Translated by Annick le Goyat.
 German:  Translated by Maria Hummitzsch and Ulrich Blumenbach
 Hebrew:  Translated by the author.
 Hungarian:  Translated by Gitta Tóth.
 Icelandic: Fólkið frá öndverðu óttast ekki. Bjartur  |Neon. September 2013. . Translated by Jón Hallur Stefánsson.
 Italian:  Translated by F. Pedone.
 Korean: 영원의 사람들은 두려워하지 않는다 . November 2013.
 Norwegian: Evighetens folk kjenner ingen frykt. Cappelen Damm. 2013. . Translated by Johanne Fronth-Nygren.
 Polish:  Translated by Urszula Gardner.
 Portuguese: 
 Romanian: Oamenii eternităţii nu se tem niciodată. Polirom. June 2014. .
 Serbian:  Translated by Marko Mladenović.
 Spanish:  Translated by Eugenia Vázquez Nacarino.
 Swedish:  Translated by Erik MacQueen.
 United Kingdom: The People of Forever Are Not Afraid. Hogarth. February 2013. .

References

2013 British novels
English novels
21st-century Israeli novels
Novels about the military
2013 debut novels
Hogarth Press books